"Bop Gun (Endangered Species)" is a song by the funk band Parliament, the lead track on their 1977 album Funkentelechy Vs. the Placebo Syndrome. It was released as the album's first single. The song's lead vocal is performed by Glenn Goins, his last performance on a P-Funk record.

The Bop Gun is an imaginary weapon that makes whatever it shoots funky. It was used as a stage prop in Parliament's late-1970s concerts. George Clinton is depicted wielding it on the cover of the Funkentelechy Vs. the Placebo Syndrome album. It is also featured on the cover of Funkadelic's 1979 album Uncle Jam Wants You.

Charts

Weekly charts

References

Further reading

Parliament (band) songs
1977 singles
Songs written by George Clinton (funk musician)
Casablanca Records singles
Songs written by Bootsy Collins
Songs written by Garry Shider
1977 songs